Hoosier Racing Tire is an American tire manufacturer primarily specializing in the production of tires for competition use. Headquartered in Lakeville, Indiana, the company was founded in 1957. Hoosier employs nearly 500 people, and has provided tires for use in series sanctioned by IHRA, ARCA, CRA, NASCAR, IMCA, WISSOTA, SCCA, NASA, AIS, USAC, World of Outlaws and Lucas Oil Late Model Dirt Series. Hoosier makes tires aimed at both amateurs and professionals competing in a variety of disciplines including stock car racing, road racing, dirt track racing, drag racing, rallying, and more.

The business was purchased by Continental AG on October 4 of 2016. The tire company was purchased for a total nearing 140 million dollars. Following the purchase, 27-year veteran John DeSalle was named president.

Founders 
The company was founded in 1957 in Lakeville, Indiana. Stock car racer Robert Newton wished to design a faster tire compound to gain an advantage against fellow racers. This was done by retreading street tires in order to obtain a compound that would adequately gain enough traction. Using an abandoned barn to start his business, he began sales to local racers. The Hoosier logo is colored after Newton's race car at the time which was purple.

The founder of Hoosier Racing Tire, Robert Newton, died in 2012, aged 85, at his home in Lakeville, Indiana. His wife and co-founder, Joyce Newton, died aged 85 on January 16, 2018.

Continental Tire produces most motorsport-related tires at the Plymouth, Indiana plant, carrying the Hoosier, Continental, and General brands.

Gallery

See also
 List of tire companies

References

External links 
 Hoosier Racing Tire | Official Website

Continental AG
Tire manufacturers of the United States
Automotive companies established in 1957
Companies based in St. Joseph County, Indiana
Lakeville, Indiana

Companies based in Indiana